Hatchet is an American thrash metal band from San Francisco, California, formed in January 2005 by guitarist and vocalist Julz Ramos, the band's only remaining original member. To date, they have released four studio albums, two demos and one EP, and are now notable for being part of the thrash metal revival movement in the late 2000s. Influenced by the new wave of British heavy metal and Bay Area thrash metal scenes of the 1980s, Hatchet's music has been variously described by critics as thrash metal, crossover thrash and punk rock.

History
Hatchet was formed in January 2005, and recorded their first demo Frailty of the Flesh the following year. Following this was their second demo, simply titled Frailty Demo, and a self-titled EP, both released in 2007. These releases as well as an appearance on the Thrash Metal Warriors compilation and high-profile shows in the Bay Area (such as opening for a reunited Possessed) attracted the attention of Metal Blade Records, who released the band's debut album Awaiting Evil in May 2008. Awaiting Evil received positive reviews from the music press, and several months after its release the band went on hiatus. By early 2009, however, Ramos reformed Hatchet with a new lineup featuring himself and Sterling Bailey on guitar, Eric Lundgren on vocals, Ryan King on bass and Alex Perez on drums, and following this, the band embarked on a US tour with Havok.

It took five years, more member changes and a switch to record labels (from Metal Blade to The End), until the release of their second album Dawn of the End in March 2013. The album got good reviews, and Hatchet toured relentlessly in support of it, reportedly playing over 200 shows with the likes of Soilwork, the Jeff Loomis Band, Blackguard, Trivium, Flotsam and Jetsam, Exmortus, Warbringer, Havok, Lich King, Black Tide, Cellador and Threat Signal. The success of Dawn of the Dead also resulted in Hatchet shooting their first-ever music video "Signals of Infection".

Hatchet's third album, Fear Beyond Lunacy, was released on October 30, 2015, and was their first and only release with the new lineup of Ramos, Clayton Cagle on guitar, Kody Barba on bass, and Ben Smith on drums. Fear Beyond Lunacy was well-received by the music press, with Blabbermouth.net describing it as "a well-performed replication of classic San Fran thrash, reminiscent of Testament, Death Angel, Heathen and Exodus along with L.A.'s Agent Steel." In promotion of Fear Beyond Lunacy, music videos were shot for "In Fear We Trust" and "Tearing Into Hell", and Hatchet toured for nearly two years in support of the album, sharing the stage with the likes of Metal Church, Flotsam and Jetsam, Helstar, Act of Defiance, Eliminate, Black Fast and Green Death. Fear Beyond Lunacy would also be Hatchet's final album before they switched record labels from The End to Combat Records.

Hatchet's fourth album and Combat debut, Dying to Exist, was released on June 22, 2018, and has been described by critics as the band's "heaviest and most focused release to date." This was also Hatchet's first album to chart in the US, peaking at number 23 on Billboards Top Heatseekers chart, and the band released three videos in order to promote the album: "Desire for Oppression", "Silent Genocide" and "Back Into Dust". Hatchet toured non-stop in support of Dying to Exist, playing with bands like Kataklysm, Exhorder, Exmortus, The Absence, Krisiun, Novareign, Immortal Guardian, Black Fast and Micawber.

Band members

Current members
 Julz Ramos – lead guitars (2005–present), vocals (2009–present)
 Ben Smith – drums (2014–present)
 Clayton Cagle – lead guitars (2015–present)
 Devin Reiche – bass (2017–present)

Former members
 Marcus Kirchen – vocals (?–2009)
 Eric Lundgren – vocals (2009)
 Sterling Bailey – guitar
 Jon Fryman – guitar (2010–2012)
 Clark Webb – guitar (2012–?)
 Lou Bianco – bass
 Dan Voigt – bass (?–2009)
 Ryan King – bass (2009–2010)
 Travis Russey – bass (2010–2013)
 Joey Karpowicz – bass (2013–2015)
 Kody Barba – bass (2015–2017)
 Dave Wert – drums (2005–2008)
 Alex Perez – drums (2018–2011)
 Eli Lucas – drums (2011–2014)

Discography

Studio albums
 Awaiting Evil (2008)
 Dawn of the End (2013)
 Fear Beyond Lunacy (2015)
 Dying to Exist (2018)

EPs
 Hatchet (2007)

Demos
 Frailty of the Flesh (2006)
 Frailty Demo (2007)

References

2005 establishments in California
American thrash metal musical groups
Musical groups established in 2005
Musical groups from San Francisco
Musical quartets